Waters and Elsa Burrows Historic District is a U.S. historic district located at 400 Palmetto Avenue, Osprey, Florida, Sarasota County.

It was added to the National Register of Historic Places on February 3, 2012.

References

National Register of Historic Places in Sarasota County, Florida
Historic districts on the National Register of Historic Places in Florida